The 2011 Paris–Roubaix was the 109th running of the Paris–Roubaix single-day cycling race, often known as the Hell of the North.

's Johan Vansummeren claimed victory after making a solo breakaway from a four-man group with  remaining, holding on to win by 19 seconds at the velodrome in Roubaix. He also held on to victory, despite riding the final  with a flat rear tyre. Tjallingii completed the podium in third.

Teams 
25 teams competed in the 2011 Paris–Roubaix. They were:

Teams for Paris-Roubaix

Wild Cards

Results

See also 
 2011 in road cycling

References

Paris–Roubaix
Paris-Roubaix
Paris-Roubaix
Paris-Roubaix